"Romeo" is a song written and recorded by American country music artist Dolly Parton. The song featured fellow country music artists Mary Chapin Carpenter, Pam Tillis, Billy Ray Cyrus, Kathy Mattea, and Tanya Tucker. It was released in January 1993 as the first single from the album Slow Dancing with the Moon. The song reached number 27 on the Billboard Hot Country Singles & Tracks chart. The song was nominated for the Grammy Award for Best Country Collaboration with Vocals.

The music video was shot in black and white and featured all of the artists that sang on the track with the notable missing Pam Tillis, whom was unavailable for the video shoot.

Content
People described the song as featuring Cyrus "as a growling male sex object who is subjected to leering catcalls by Dolly and sidekicks...This equal-opportunity misbehavior is the most memorable thing about 'Romeo.'"

Chart performance

References

1993 singles
Dolly Parton songs
Mary Chapin Carpenter songs
Pam Tillis songs
Billy Ray Cyrus songs
Kathy Mattea songs
Tanya Tucker songs
Vocal collaborations
Songs written by Dolly Parton
Song recordings produced by Steve Buckingham (record producer)
Columbia Records singles
1993 songs